Casimiro Torres Saavedra (4 March 1905 – 17 November 1977) was a Chilean football player who played as a midfielder.

Career
He played for Everton de Viña del Mar from 1928 in the Asociación de Football de Valparaíso, becoming the team captain.

At international level, he represented Chile in the 1930 FIFA World Cup.

References

External links
Casimiro Torres at PartidosdeLaRoja 

1905 births

1977 deaths
Chilean footballers
Chile international footballers
Everton de Viña del Mar footballers
1930 FIFA World Cup players
Association football midfielders
Place of birth missing
Place of death missing